Bo'ai Campus, University of Taipei was a normal university in Zhongzheng District, Taipei, Taiwan.

History
TMUE was founded as Academy of Language in 1895. In 1987, it became the Taipei Municipal Teacher's College. In 2005, it was granted university status and changed to its current name Taipei Municipal University of Education (TMUE). In August 2013, TMUE was merged with Taipei Physical Education College to form the University of Taipei.

See also
 Education in Taiwan

References

1895 establishments in Taiwan
2013 disestablishments in Taiwan
Defunct universities and colleges in Taiwan
University of Taipei
Teachers colleges
Educational institutions established in 1895
Educational institutions disestablished in 2013